PLUSPLUS is a Ukrainian free-to-air television channel, part of the 1+1 Media Group. According to the group, PLUSPLUS is a family channel oriented towards shared viewing by parents and children, when the whole family gathers in front of TV.

History

Channel launch as 'CITI' (2006)
CITI was a regional television channel broadcasting in Kiev from 1 December 2006 to 3 August 2012. It was founded by Studio 1+1 and was a media holding of 1+1 Media Group, owned by Ihor Kolomoyskyi. In general, the channel broadcast educational programs of Kiev and children and family movies and cartoons manufactured by the USSR. The slogan was "Канал TVого міста." (your city's channel). General manager was Natalia Vashko.

Rebranding to PLUSPLUS (2012)

The channel was relaunched on 4 August 2012 as PLUSPLUS, with new Disney Channel content moved across after the closure of Disney Channel in the country. While developing the program concept, PLUSPLUS collaborated with government agencies, academic and research institutions using government programs, regulations and developments, as well as their recommendations. The channel content is created in a such way as to make it interesting for both children, and their parents.

In 2012 it was awarded the National Television Award "Triumph" in the "Discovery of the Year", and in December 2012, PLUSPLUS launched the broadcasting of Disney programming divided into morning and afternoon blocks, which make up six hours of daily programs.

In 2013, PLUSPLUS has been producing the range of in-house programs, each of which performs educational, training, developing and other functions. The channel has prepared three projects “Fairy Tale with Dad” a 10-minute program where famous dads read tales for kids; “Tips and Tricks”: animated pictures with solutions of “children’s” problems; and “Happiness Every Day”: videos on how to make a kid happy.

Rebrand 
In 2012, the channel rebranded with the aim of appearing Western European in outlook, with a nod to Ukrainian/Soviet culture and history. The rebrand was completed by UK design agency Studio.Build, who developed a set of changeable family characters, designed to be the heroes of the channel, with a set of teasers and indents, produced by specialist character-animation studio Animade. They also developed a custom typeface for all on-air and off-air communications. The consultancy worked with Ukraine-based illustrator Edik Katykhin.

Programming

Animated series
 100% Wolf: Legend of the Moonstone
 44 Cats
 Abby Hatcher
 Adventure Time
 The Adventures of Paddington
 ALVINNN!!! and the Chipmunks
 The Amazing World of Gumball
 Arthur and the Minimoys (fr)
 Astroblast!
 Baby Shark's Big Show!
 Bakugan: Battle Planet
 Barbie Dreamhouse Adventures
 Ben and Holly's Little Kingdom
 Beyblade Burst
 Blaze and the Monster Machines
 Boonie Bears (Beware of Bears)
 Brave Bunnies(December 5, 2020 – present)
 Bubble Guppies
 Chuggington
 Cossacks. Football (uk)
 Dexter's Laboratory
 Dogmatix and the Indomitables (fr)
 Dora the Explorer
 Endangered Species
 Eskimoska (uk)
 Filly Funtasia (November 30, 2019 – 2020)
 The Fixies
 Fuzion Max
 Get Blake!
 Gigantosaurus
 Legends of Spark
 LEGO Friends
 Lego Nexo Knights
 Lego Ninjago: Masters of Spinjitzu
 Leo da Vinci (it)
 Le Petit Spirou
 Littlest Pet Shop
 Littlest Pet Shop: A World of Our Own
 Little Charmers
 Little Princess
 Horrid Henry
 Hubert and Takako
 Infinity Nado
 I.N.K. Invisible Network of Kids
 Jamie's Got Tentacles
 Pin-Code
 Kung Fu Panda: Legends of Awesomeness
 Masha and the Bear
 Masha's Tales
 Maya the Bee
 Miraculous: Tales of Ladybug & Cat Noir
 Monkart: Legend of Monster Kart
 My Little Pony: Friendship is Magic
 My Little Pony: Pony Life
 Nella the Princess Knight
 Ni Hao Kai-Lan
 Oggy and the Cockroaches
 The Owl & Co
 PAW Patrol
 The Penguins of Madagascar 
 Peppa Pig
 Power Players
 The Powerpuff Girls
 Rainbow High
 Rated A for Awesome
 Rev & Roll 
 Rob the Robot
 Rusty Rivets
 Screechers Wild! (pt)
 Sherazade: The Untold Stories
 Shimmer and Shine
 The Simpsons
 The Smurfs
 Sonic Boom (January 31, 2022 – present)
 SpongeBob SquarePants (February 1, 2018 – present)
 SuperThings Rivals Of Kaboom
 Super Wings
 Talking Tom and Friends
 Team Umizoomi
 Thomas & Friends
 Tractor Tom
 Transformers: Cyberverse
 Transformers: Rescue Bots
 Transformers: Robots in Disguise
 Tobot
 Top Wing
 Turning Mecard
 The Wild Adventures of Blinky Bill
 Winx Club
 Yo-kai Watch
 Zack & Quack
 Zak Storm

Disney animated series
 101 Dalmatian Street (October 20, 2020 – present)
 Amphibia (August 20, 2020 – present)
 American Dragon Jake Long
 Chip 'n Dale: Rescue Rangers
 Doc McStuffins
 DuckTales
 DuckTales (2017 TV series)
 Elena of Avalor
 Fancy Nancy
 Gravity Falls
 Jake and the Neverland Pirates
 Kid vs. Kat
 Lilo & Stitch: The Series
 Little Einsteins
 Mickey Mouse Clubhouse
 Mickey and the Roadster Racers
 Mickey Mouse Mixed-Up Adventures 
 Miles from Tomorrowland
 Milo Murphy's Law
 Penn Zero: Part-Time Hero
 Pepper Ann
 Phineas and Ferb
 PJ Masks
 Puppy Dog Pals
 Recess
 Sheriff Callie's Wild West
 Sofia the First
 Star vs. the Forces of Evil
 Star Wars Rebels
 Special Agent Oso
 Tangled: The Series 
 Timon & Pumbaa
 The Lion Guard
 Vampirina
 Wander Over Yonder

Sitcoms
 Imagination Movers
 Jessie
 Hannah Montana
 Jonas
 Good Luck Charlie
 The Suite Life of Zack and Cody
 Dog with a Blog

Other programs
 Marvi Hämmer (de)
 Mister Maker
 Art Attack
 Jumble
 Shot mom
 Robot Zeke in the animal world
 Fairy Tale with Dad

External links

1+1 Media Group page

References

Television stations in Ukraine
Television channels and stations established in 2012
Ukrainian brands
Ukrainian-language television stations
Television channels and stations established in 2006
Ukrainian-language television stations in Ukraine
2006 establishments in Ukraine
2012 establishments in Ukraine
1+1 Media Group